Jeremiah Martin Green (March 4, 1977December 31, 2022) was an American musician best known as a founding member and drummer of the indie rock band Modest Mouse from 1993 to March 2003, and again from May 2004 until his death in December 2022.

Early life 
Jeremiah Martin Green was born on March 4, 1977, in Oahu, Hawaii, while his father was stationed there in the Army. He grew up in Moxee, Washington, a few miles outside of Yakima. His family moved to the Seattle area in 1989. He had an older brother named Adam. His father was an alcoholic who was abusive to Green; he later apologized and reconciled with his son.

Green took drumming lessons for three months in his early teens but was uninspired by his teacher. He immersed himself in the Seattle music scene, joining a band and attending concerts at night. His early influences included local groups such as Treepeople and Hammerbox. His first favorite band was the English Gothic rock band The Cure; Green was particularly inspired by the drumming on their 1982 album Pornography. However, Green cited the Washington D.C. post-hardcore band Fugazi as his biggest influence for starting a band.

Career 
Green began his touring and recording career while he was in high school. In 1993, he became a founding member of Modest Mouse, formed with Isaac Brock and Eric Judy in Issaquah, Washington. In the mid-1990s, Green played with the bands Satisfact on K Records, Red Stars Theory on Touch and Go Records, and Peeved on Distressed Records. Green also played with the bands Vells and Psychic Emperor. Both bands played at venues around Seattle and the Pacific Northwest.

In 2003, on his birthday, Green quit Modest Mouse. He later revealed that he suffered a nervous breakdown and was briefly admitted to a psychiatric hospital. He had earlier been diagnosed with bipolar disorder and prescribed the antidepressant Effexor. Combined with alcohol and psilocybin mushrooms, he experienced severe manic episodes. After quitting, the band had quickly convinced Green to return, but on the second day of recording in Portland he exploded in argument and then disappeared for two months. He stopped taking his antidepressants and experienced a painful period of withdrawal. Faced with Green's absence, Modest Mouse initially considered breaking up. Green was eventually replaced by Benjamin Weikel of The Helio Sequence. Green's departure caused him to be absent during the entire recording process of the band's 2004 album Good News for People Who Love Bad News. Green officially rejoined the band in May 2004. In 2007, Green appeared on Graig Markel's Via Novella on the Sonic Boom Label. In May 2008, Green released a drum breaks 7" collaboration with Plastiq Phantom under the alias World Gang on the Imputor? label.

Style and reception 
Of his work on Sad Sappy Sucker, Spencer Owen at Pitchfork Media said, "Jeremiah Green proves himself to be one of indie rock's best drummers, even this early on in the game." In an interview, Benjamin Weikel stated that Green's drum parts have a "great, loose feeling that's hard to emulate".

Green placed 37th in Stylus Magazines list of "50 Greatest Rock Drummers", where Jonathan Bradley described his drumming:

Personal life 
Green was married to Lauren, who owned the store Thuja in downtown Port Townsend, Washington. Their son was born in 2016.

On December 25, 2022, it was announced that Green had been diagnosed with stage IV cancer. He died in Sequim, Washington, on December 31, 2022 at age 45.

References

External links 
 
 

1977 births
2022 deaths
Musicians from Washington (state)
20th-century American drummers
American male drummers
Modest Mouse members
Epic Records artists
21st-century American drummers
20th-century American male musicians
21st-century American male musicians
People with bipolar disorder
Deaths from cancer in Washington (state)
People from Yakima County, Washington